Arthur Henry Forst (February 17, 1891 – October 5, 1963) was a professional football player in the early National Football League for the Providence Steam Roller. He was also a professional player for the Waterbury Blues (later renamed the Hartford Blues), prior to that team's entry into the NFL in 1926.

Personal life
Forst attended Villanova Preparatory High School before later attending Villanova University a private, Catholic, coeducational, research higher education institute in Villanova, Pennsylvania.

Football career
In 1925 Forst was one of the "top backs" of the Waterbury Blues alongside Ken Simendinger from Holy Cross. In their only NFL contest of 1925, the Blues beat the Rochester Jeffersons 7-6.
The Blues went on to begin the 1926 NFL season with several losses, only winning three games that season. Forst is credited with only starting two games, both of which he started in as fullback.

Death
Arthur Henry Forst died on October 5, 1963 in Seymour, Connecticut, United States.

References

1891 births
1963 deaths
Players of American football from Connecticut
American football fullbacks
Providence Steam Roller players
Waterbury Blues players
Villanova Wildcats football players
People from Derby, Connecticut